Jacques Vandier (28 October 1904 – 15 October 1973) was a French Egyptologist.

He was the husband of the Egyptologist Jeanne Marie Thérèse Vandier d'Abbadie.

References

External links
 https://www.persee.fr/doc/crai_0065-0536_1975_num_119_1_13075

1904 births
1973 deaths
Corresponding Fellows of the British Academy
French Egyptologists
Place of birth missing
People from Nord (French department)